The Golf Disneyland is a golf complex operated by The Walt Disney Parks, Experiences and Products, located at Disneyland Paris in Marne-la-Vallée, France. The complex includes a Disney-themed golf course. Popular with adult visitors, it also has a children's section. Within the golf course is the Marriott Village. Other Disney Golf offerings include the Palm, the Magnolia, the Lake Buena Vista, and Oak Trail golf courses at the Walt Disney World Resort in Lake Buena Vista, FL.

External links
 Golf Disneyland official site

Disneyland Paris
Golf clubs and courses in France
Sports venues in Seine-et-Marne